Belarus debuted in the Eurovision Song Contest 2004 with the song "My Galileo" written by Aleksey Solomaha, Alexandra Kirsanova and Konstantin Drapezo. The song was performed by Aleksandra and Konstantin. The Belarusian entry for the 2004 contest in Istanbul, Turkey was selected through a national final organised by the Belarusian broadcaster National State Television and Radio Company of the Republic of Belarus (BTRC). The national final consisted of fifteen competing acts participating in a televised production where public voting selected the winner. "Moy galiley" performed by Aleksandra and Konstantin was selected as the winner with 2,311 votes. The song was later retitled as "My Galileo".

Belarus competed in the semi-final of the Eurovision Song Contest which took place on 12 May 2004. Performing during the show in position 2, "My Galileo" was not announced among the top 10 entries of the semi-final and therefore did not qualify to compete in the final. It was later revealed that Belarus placed nineteenth out of the 22 participating countries in the semi-final with 10 points.

Background 

On 21 February 2003, the Belarusian national broadcaster, National State Television and Radio Company of the Republic of Belarus (BTRC), confirmed their intentions to debut at the 2004 Eurovision Song Contest for the first time after broadcasting both 2002 and 2003 contests. The nation had previously planned to debut at the Eurovision Song Contest in 1993 and 2003; the latter year the broadcaster was unable to take part after the European Broadcasting Union (EBU) decided that too many countries would be relegated from participation in 2003 if the country took part. BTRC would also broadcast the event within Belarus and organise the selection process for the nation's entry. The broadcaster organised a national final in order to choose their 2004 entry.

Before Eurovision

National final 
The Belarusian national final took place on 31 January 2004. Fifteen songs participated in the competition and the winner was selected exclusively via a public vote. The show was broadcast on the First Channel and Radius FM.

Competing entries 
Artists and composers were able to submit their applications and entries to the broadcaster between 22 October 2003 and 14 December 2003. Songs could be performed in any language, however, a translation of the lyrics to English and Belarusian/Russian were required, and at least part of the song had to be performed in English. At the closing of the deadline, 200 entries were received by the broadcaster, of which 59 were valid. A jury panel was tasked with selecting fifteen entries to proceed to the televised national final. The jury consisted of Vladimir Maksimkov (general producer of the First Channel), Yuriy Tsarev (head of the radio station "Radius FM"), Leonid Zakhlevny (artistic director of the ensemble Beseda), Viktor Babarikin (chief conductor of the Presidential Orchestra of the Republic of Belarus), Eduard Zaritsky (composer), Vladimir Ivanov (composer), Vasily Rainchik (musician/composer), Raisa Baravikova (chief editor of the magazine "Maladost"), Alexander Tikhanovich (singer) and Yuriy Igrusha (general producer of the broadcaster ONT). The selected finalists were announced on 31 December 2003. On 4 January 2004, BTRC announced that "Kali chakra, a i luz" performed by Jur'ya had been disqualified from the national final due to the band not signing the contract for participation. They were replaced with the song "People Say" performed by Adelina Petrosyan.

Final 
The televised final took place on 31 January 2004 at the BTRC studios in Minsk, hosted by Larisa Gribaleva and Ales Kruglyakov. Prior to the competition, a draw for the running order took place on 22 January 2004. The performances of the competing entries were filmed on 23 January 2004, and the majority were performed in English despite their Russian titles. A public vote consisting of televoting and online voting selected the song "Moy galiley" performed by Aleksandra and Konstantin as the winner.

Controversy 
The Belarusian national final caused controversy due to accusations of vote rigging. In addition to the collapse of the online voting platform due to high influx, figures provided by communications company Beltelecom revealed that Natalia Podolskaya was the actual winner with 14,506 votes while Aleksandra and Konstantin only placed third with 2,260 votes. Beltelecom later clarified that the official results from BTRC were based on votes received from another company as they did not directly provide the broadcaster with services for conducting the voting. Podolskaya's father stated that he would be filling a lawsuit to nullify the voting results.

At Eurovision
It was announced that the competition's format would be expanded to include a semi-final in 2004. According to the rules, all nations with the exceptions of the host country, the "Big Four" (France, Germany, Spain and the United Kingdom) and the ten highest placed finishers in the 2003 contest are required to qualify from the semi-final on 12 May 2004 in order to compete for the final on 15 May 2004; the top ten countries from the semi-final progress to the final. On 23 March 2004, a special allocation draw was held which determined the running order for the semi-final and Belarus was set to perform in position 2, following the entry from Finland and before the entry from Switzerland. At the end of the semi-final, Belarus was not announced among the top 10 entries in the semi-final and therefore failed to qualify to compete in the final. It was later revealed that Belarus placed nineteenth in the semi-final, receiving a total of 10 points.

The semi-final and the final were broadcast in Belarus on the First Channel with commentary by Ales Kruglyakov. The Belarusian spokesperson, who announced the Belarusian votes during the final, was Denis Kurian.

Voting 
Below is a breakdown of points awarded to Belarus and awarded by Belarus in the semi-final and grand final of the contest. The nation awarded its 12 points to Ukraine in the semi-final and to Russia in the final of the contest.

Points awarded to Belarus

Points awarded by Belarus

References

Bibliography 
 

2004
Countries in the Eurovision Song Contest 2004
Eurovision